The Greyfriars, Lincoln was a Franciscan friary in Lincolnshire, England. The surviving building is the remains of the infirmary of the friary, built of dressed stone and brick and dating from c.1230, with mid 19th century additions.

History

Franciscan Friary
Building of the Friary was started in 1237 on land donated to the Franciscan order and was completed by the 1280s. The community was expelled in 1538 as part of the Dissolution of the Monasteries.

Burials in the friary
Lady Alice de Roos (daughter of  William de Ros of Helmsley), wife of John Comyn I of Badenoch

Grammar School and Mechanics' Institute

The building was let to William Monson, whose son Richard opened a school there in 1568. From 1574 the school became the Corporation Grammar School run by Lincoln City Council on the upper floor until 1900.
The undercroft was successively used as a spinning school which became known as  the Jersey School until 1831, a Mechanics' Institute from 1833 to 1862 and as part of the Grammar School from 1862 to 1899. George Boole participated in the Mechanics' Institute.

City and County Museum

Under Lincoln City Council
In 1900 the building ceased to be used as a school. It was restored under the supervision of Lincoln architect William Watkins.  It was opened to the public as the City and County Museum on 22 May 1907. The Museum was administered by the City of Lincoln and the first Curator was Arthur Smith who retired in 1934 and was followed by F. T. (Tom) Baker, who was the son of the Lincoln architect Fred Baker.

Lincolnshire County Council
In 1974 control of the Museum passed to Lincolnshire County Council. In September 1993 the museum's use of Greyfriars changed with the building becoming a venue for annually changing exhibitions while its main collections underwent a programme of conservation and research in expectation of a new home being built. In 2005, The Collection opened on a new site on Danesgate, adjacent to the Usher Gallery, with the two being jointly managed as a cultural centre for art and archaeology.

After closure the building was used for a period by the Central Library, but from 2008 has been left vacant, apart from occasional use for contemporary art exhibitions and installations. In 2016 the city council considered selling the building.

Literature
Antram N (revised), Pevsner N & Harris J, (1989), The Buildings of England: Lincolnshire, Yale University Press. pp 508–9.
Baker F.T. (1985) A Lifetime with Lincolnshire Archaeology Journal for Lincolnshire and Archaeology, Vol 20 and re-printed by the Society. .
Hayfield C (2006). Conservation Plan for the Greyfriars Building, Lincoln. Report for the City of Lincoln Council.
Lee A (2019), The man who made the Museum: Arthur Smith and the founding of the Lincoln's City and County Museum. Part Two - the development of the Museum. Lincolnshire Past & Present, No. 115, Spring 2019, pp. 13–17.  
Little A G (1906), Grey Friars of Lincoln  in  Victoria  County History of the  County of Lincoln, Vol II (ed. W. Page) pp. 222–4.
Leach A.F. (1906), Schools-Lincoln Grammar School in  Victoria  County History of the  County of Lincoln, Vol II (ed. W. Page) 421-443
Martin A R (1935), "The Greyfriars of Lincoln", Archaeological Journal Vol 92, pg 42–63. 
Moore C. N. (1972), City and County Museum, Lincoln. 24pp 
Padley J.S., (1851) Selections from the Ancient Monastic Ecclesiastical and Domestic edifices of Lincolnshire, Lincoln.
Simpson E. Mansel (1903) The Grey Friary, Lincoln Lincolnshire Notes and Queries, pp193–202.
Stocker D.A. (1984), The remains of the Franciscan friary in Lincoln, York Archaeological Papers, York Archaeological Trust, 135–137.
Watkins W & Son (1903) Report on the Proposed Conversion of the building known as "The Greyfriars" to the purposes of a Museum, with a brief account of the Archaeological History of the Structure Lincoln Corporation.7pp.

References

External links 

British Listed Buildings

Monasteries in Lincolnshire
History of Lincoln, England
Buildings and structures in Lincoln, England